The China Aerospace Science and Technology Corporation, or CASC, is the main contractor for the Chinese space program. It is state-owned and has subsidiaries which design, develop and manufacture a range of spacecraft, launch vehicles, strategic and tactical missile systems, and ground equipment. It was officially established in July 1999 as part of a Chinese government reform drive, having previously been one part of the former China Aerospace Corporation. Various incarnations of the program date back to 1956.

Along with space and defense manufacture, CASC also produces machinery, chemicals, communications equipment, transportation equipment, computers, medical care products and environmental protection equipment. CASC provides commercial launch services to the international market. By the end of 2013, the corporation has registered capital of CN￥294.02 billion and employs 170,000 people.

In December 2017, the CASC was converted from a state-owned enterprise (全民所有制企业) to a state-owned enterprise (国有独资公司) with the approval of the State-owned Assets Supervision and Administration Commission of the State Council (SASAC). The sole shareholder is SASAC, the company's headquarters are still in Beijing, the business areas remained the same and nothing changed for the staff either.

In 2021, China's 14th five year plan included two low earth orbit satellite constellations named “GW” featuring nearly 13,000 satellites was in development.

In November 2020, U.S. President Donald Trump issued an executive order prohibiting U.S. companies and individuals owning shares in companies that the United States Department of Defense has listed as having links to the People's Liberation Army, which included CASC. In August 2022, CASC's 9th Academy 771 and 772 Research Institutes were added to the United States Department of Commerce's Entity List.

Subordinate entities

R&D and production complexes 
 China Academy of Launch Vehicle Technology (CALT)
 China Energine International (Holdings) Limited
 Academy of Aerospace Solid Propulsion Technology (AASPT)
 China Academy of Space Technology (CAST)
 Academy of Aerospace Liquid Propulsion Technology (AALPT)
 Sichuan Academy of Aerospace Technology (SAAT)
 Shanghai Academy of Spaceflight Technology (SAST)
 China Academy of Aerospace Electronics Technology (CAAET)
 China Academy of Aerospace Aerodynamics (CAAA)

Specialized companies 
 China Satellite Communications
 APT Satellite International 
 APT Satellite Holdings
 China Great Wall Industry Corporation Limited (CGWIC)
 China Aerospace International Holdings
 Beijing Shenzhou Aerospace Software Technology Co, Ltd.
 China Spacesat Co. Ltd.
 China Siwei Surveying and Mapping Technology Co, Ltd
 China Aerospace Investment Holdings
 Easy Smart Limited

Directly subordinated units 
The "directly subordinated units" of the China Aerospace Science and Technology Corporation are:
 China Astronautics Standards Institute
 China Astronautics Publishing House 
 Space Archives
 Aerospace Communication Center
 China Space News
 Chinese Society of Astronautics
 Aerospace Talent Development & Exchange Center
 Aerospace Printing Office

See also 
 China Aerospace Science and Industry Corporation
 China National Space Administration
 Aviation Industry Corporation of China (AVIC)
 Commission of Science, Technology and Industry for National Defense
 CASC Rainbow (UAV)

References

External links
  

 
Space program of the People's Republic of China
Aerospace companies of China
Manufacturing companies based in Beijing
Technology companies established in 1999
Commercial launch service providers
Communications satellite operators
Conglomerate companies of China
Government-owned companies of China
Chinese companies established in 1999
Chinese brands
Defence companies of the People's Republic of China